Giovanni Maria Morandi (30 April 1622 – 18 February 1717) was an Italian painter, mainly active in Rome and his natal city of Florence, but also Venice. He is said to have briefly trained in Florence with Sigismondo Coccapani and Giovanni Bilivert.

In Rome, he painted numerous altarpieces, including the Death of Mary in the church of Santa Maria della Pace, but also works in Santa Maria in Vallicella and Santa Maria del Popolo. He painted an Annunciation for the church of Santa Maria della Scala in Siena. Among his pupils was Odoardo Vicinelli.

References

1622 births
1717 deaths
17th-century Italian painters
Italian male painters
18th-century Italian painters
Italian Baroque painters
Painters from Florence
18th-century Italian male artists